Vítor José, two Portuguese given names, may refer to:

Vítor Pereira (footballer, born 1978), Portuguese footballer
Vítor Campos (1944–2019), Portuguese footballer

Portuguese given names